Reginald or Reggie Davis may refer to:

 Reginald Davis (cricketer), Australian cricketer
 Reginald Davis (judge), South African judge
 Reginald Ben Davis, British wildlife artist 
 Reggie Davis (tight end), American football coach
 Reggie Davis (wide receiver), NFL wide receiver

See also
 Reginald Davis Johnson, American architect